Millner is a surname. Notable people with the surname include:

 David Millner (born 1938), English cricketer
 Denene Millner (born 1968), American author and journalist
 F. Ann Millner, American educator
 Guy Millner (born 1936), American businessman
 James Millner (doctor) (1830–1875), early Australian doctor and pioneer
 James Millner (pharmacist) AM (1919–2007), pharmacist and Australian corporate executive
 John J. Millner (born 1951), American politician
 Joshua Millner (1849–1931), British sport shooter
 Robert Millner (born 1950), Australian corporate executive
 Tivadar Millner (1899–1988), Hungarian inventor 
 Wayne Millner (1913–1976), American football player

Occupational surnames
Jewish surnames
English-language occupational surnames